Lum or LUM may refer to:

People
 Lao Lum, an ethnic group of Laos
 Lum (surname), various surnames of English and Chinese origin (including a list of people with these surnames)
 Lum Croxton (1885–1916), American Negro League baseball pitcher
 Lum Davenport (1900–1961), American Major League baseball pitcher
 Lum Harris (1915–1996), American Major League baseball pitcher
 Lum Snyder (1930–1985), American football player
 Lum Rexhepi (born 1992), Albanian footballer

Places
 Lum, Michigan, an unincorporated community in Lapeer County, Michigan, United States
 Lum, Albania, village in northeastern Albania
 Lum, Sikkim, India

Other
 Lumican, a protein encoded by the LUM gene
 Alfa Lum cycling team
 IBM LUM (licence use management)
 WLUM-FM, a radio station in Milwaukee, Wisconsin
 Place of Memory, Tolerance and Social Inclusion, a Peruvian museum, abbreviated LUM in Spanish

Transportation
 IATA code for Dehong Mangshi Airport, China
 MTR station code for Lung Mun stop, Hong Kong

In popular culture
Lum, short for hoodlum from the Rayman games
A character in Lum and Abner, American radio comedy (short for the name Columbus)
Lum (Urusei Yatsura), a character from Urusei Yatsura
Urusei Yatsura, sometimes referred to as Lum
Lum the Mad (Greyhawk)
Lum the Mad, also known as Scott Jennings, MMORPG commentator

See also
LUMS (disambiguation)